The 1939 Sheffield Hallam by-election was a parliamentary by-election held in the United Kingdom on 10 May 1939 for the House of Commons constituency of Sheffield Hallam in Yorkshire.

Previous MP

Previous Result

Candidates

Result

Aftermath 
In the 1945 general election,

References
 British Parliamentary Election Results 1918-1949, compiled and edited by F.W.S. Craig (The Macmillan Press 1979)

1939 elections in the United Kingdom
1939 in England
By-elections to the Parliament of the United Kingdom in Sheffield constituencies
1930s in Sheffield